Gina Gleason is an American musician born in Philadelphia, Pennsylvania. She is the current lead guitarist and background vocalist for Baroness, replacing Pete Adams.

As a part of the Cirque du Soleil creation cast, Gleason played lead guitar and performed as the character “The Muse” in the production of Michael Jackson: One by Cirque du Soleil at Mandalay Bay in Las Vegas (2012–2017) .

Gleason co-composed original works for the 2016 Cirque du Soleil production of One Night for One Drop. The production was held live at The Smith Center as well as in theaters and IMAX nationwide.

Gina Gleason sat in with the Smashing Pumpkins during The End Times Tour at The Joint in Las Vegas. She performed with Carlos Santana during his residency at the House of Blues in Las Vegas and played on the Latin Grammys with Grammy award winner Carlos Vives in 2013. She has toured with Brendon Small, creator of Dethklok and co-creator of the animated series Metalocalypse, and with slide guitarist Denny Walley, performing at festivals such as Zappanale in Mecklenburg, Germany. Gina accompanied Jon Anderson of Yes for several performances on tour and at the NAMM show in Anaheim, California. She played with Jello Biafra in 2007 during a performance on his spoken word tour and collaborated with The Good Listeners on the song “Never Good Enough” for the documentary “Don’t Quit Your Daydream”.

As a founding member, Gina fronted and played lead guitar for Misstallica, an all-female Metallica tribute, from 2008–2012 and played lead guitar for Queen Diamond, an all-female King Diamond tribute, from 2008–2011.

References

External links

Year of birth missing (living people)
Living people
Temple University alumni
American women guitarists
Guitarists from Philadelphia
21st-century American women